Leila Fletcher (August 12, 1899 – April 9, 1988) was a Canadian pianist, composer, publisher, music editor  and educator.

Early years

She was born in Hamilton, Ontario. Her parents provided her piano lessons from a local teacher. After high school, Fletcher continued her music education at Greenville College in Illinois, the Royal Conservatory of Music, and the University of Toronto, studying with Vigo Kihl, Sir Ernest MacMillan and Dr. Healey Willan. She remained for several years as a noted faculty member.

Early career
In the 1930s she was appointed music editor for Gordon V. Thompson music publishers in Toronto. She was also later on appointed Director of music at Lorne Park College.

Publishing and Composing
In 1949, Fletcher founded her own music publishing company called Montgomery Music based in Rochester, New York eventually moving it to Buffalo and finally to Markham, Ontario where it currently exists as part of the Mayfair Montgomery Publishing house. She taught piano to young students in the Toronto public schools and to this day her piano methods books (The Leila Fletcher Piano Course) are a highly recommended resource for aspiring young piano students.

In her lifetime, she published over 250 piano solos through her publishing house.

Personal life
Leila Fletcher never married. She was reputed to be difficult to get along with and very demanding in her professional as well as personal life.  She also never lived in the United States, preferring to commute to her business in New York state from her home in Hamilton, Ontario.

External links
Mayfair's Music From Canada
The Official Leila Fletcher Web site

Canadian women pianists
Musicians from Hamilton, Ontario
1899 births
1988 deaths
The Royal Conservatory of Music alumni
20th-century Canadian composers
20th-century Canadian pianists
Women classical pianists
20th-century women composers
20th-century Canadian women musicians
Canadian women composers
20th-century women pianists